The Pearl Bowl (パールボウル) is the championship game of a yearly tournament held in the spring involving the twelve teams from the East and Central Divisions of the X-League, that are based in the Kanto region.

History
The Pearl Bowl was started in 1976, but matched a university team against a corporate or club team. The university teams won eight years in a row up to 1984.

The format was changed from the 10th edition in 1985 as a game between corporate or club teams. The Renown Rovers won the first of three straight titles that year.

Originally played at Korakuen Stadium, the championship game has been held in Tokyo Dome since it replaced Korakuen in 1988. The only exception has been 1996, when it was played at Yokohama Stadium. That year, West Division teams were allowed to participate, and the Matsushita Denko Impulse won the title.

The Lixil Deers have won the most titles with eight.

See also
Green Bowl

References

External links
  (Japanese)

American football in Japan
Annual sporting events in Japan
1976 establishments in Japan